Laird Hill is an unincorporated community in northwestern Rusk County, Texas, United States. According to the Handbook of Texas, the community had a population of 405 in 2000. It is located within the Longview, Texas metropolitan area.

History
The area in what is known as Laird Hill today was named for a local family of settlers. It was originally known as Pistol Hill during the East Texas oil boom. The community's first postmaster was Ignatius S. Crutcher, who was appointed in 1936. Its population was 500 in 1940 with eight businesses; this went down to 461 and four businesses in 1970 and ended at 405 from 1980 through 2000, and the number of businesses went up from one to five. 

On April 25, 1957, an F3 tornado struck the community.

Geography
Laird Hill is located on Texas State Highway 42, just southwest of Kilgore on the northern boundary of Rusk County. It is also on Texas State Highway 135 and Farm to Market Road 2012.

Education
The Leverett's Chapel Independent School District and the Kilgore Independent School District serve area students.

Notable person
 John Martin Thompson, Native American tribal leader and lumberjack.

References

Unincorporated communities in Rusk County, Texas
Unincorporated communities in Texas
Longview metropolitan area, Texas